Richard de Spakeston was the Dean of Wells between 1160 and 1174.

References

Deans of Wells